is a very popular masculine Japanese given name.

Possible writings
Haruto can be written using different kanji characters and can mean:
春人, "spring, person"
春大, "spring, big"
春斗, "spring, dipper"
晴人, "sunny/clear up, person"
晴斗, "sunny/clear up, dipper"
治人, "govern, person"
陽斗, "sun/yang, dipper"
遥都, "distant, city"
The name can also be written in hiragana or katakana.

People
, Japanese poet and novelist
, Japanese football player
, Japanese baseball player
, Japanese manga artist
, Japanese singer, member of South Korean band Treasure
, Japanese kickboxer

Characters
Haruto (ハルト), a character in the console role-playing game Suikoden IV
Haruto (春人), a character in the manga series Code:Breaker
Haruto Asou (遥都), a character in Japanese television drama 1 Litre no Namida
Haruto Fuwa (春斗), a character in the light novel series A Sister's All You Need
Haruto Houjou (遥都), the main character in the manga and anime series Haunted Junction
Haruto Kaguragi (晴), a character in the manga series Boys Over Flowers Season 2
Haruto Kawai (春人), a character in the Japanese romance visual novel Memories Off 5 The Unfinished Film
Haruto Kirishima (青大), the main character in the manga and the anime A Town Where You Live
Haruto Kurosaki (晴人), a character in the manga series Kurosaki-kun no Iinari ni Nante Naranai
Haruto Kurosawa (遥人), a character in the manga and anime series Coppelion
Haruto Saionji (春人), a character in the action role-playing game Shining Wind and anime series Shining Tears X Wind
Haruto Sakaki (晴人), a character in the anime series Witch Hunter Robin
Haruto Sakuraba (春人), a character in the manga series Eyeshield 21
Haruto Sohma (晴人), the main character in Kamen Rider Wizard
Haruto Tenjou (ハルト), a character in the anime series Yu-Gi-Oh! Zexal
Haruto Tokishima (ハルト), the main character in the anime Valvrave the Liberator
Haruto Yuto, a character in the video game Yandere Simulator

References 

Japanese masculine given names